A Crooked Romance is a 1917 American silent drama film directed by William Parke and starring Gladys Hulette, Paul Clerget and William Parke Jr.

It was shot at studios in Fort Lee in New Jersey.

Cast
 Gladys Hulette as Mary Flynn 
 Paul Clerget as Sid Flynn 
 William Parke Jr. as Gifford Cannon 
 J.H. Gilmour as Mike 
 James E. Sullivan

References

Bibliography
 Paul C. Spehr. The Movies Begin: Making Movies in New Jersey, 1887-1920. Newark Museum, 1977.

External links
 

1917 films
1917 drama films
1910s English-language films
American silent feature films
Silent American drama films
American black-and-white films
Films directed by William Parke
Pathé Exchange films
1910s American films